The Diesel Tilt Train is the name for three high-speed tilting train services, operated by Queensland Rail on the North Coast line from Brisbane to Cairns as part of its Spirit of Queensland service.

History
In August 1999, a contract was awarded to Walkers for two diesel tilting trains to operate services from Brisbane to Cairns. In contrast to the Electric Tilt Train, the diesel Tilt Train is a push-pull locomotive based train, although the two are externally similar.

Following a derailment of the Diesel Tilt Train in November 2004 that injured 157 people, all services were limited to  until track upgrades and the introduction of Automatic Train Protection allowed full speed operation to resume in June 2007.

In October 2010, Downer Rail was awarded a contract to build a further diesel tilt train with two power cars and 12 carriages to replace locomotive hauled stock on The Sunlander. All work was performed in Maryborough. The first refurbished set entered service in October 2013. The third and brand new set was delivered and entered service in 2014.

Liveries

The original paint scheme, or livery, was yellow, purple and silver in colour, which was retained until the Spirit Of Queensland had a major overhaul in the mid-2010s.

In 2010, designs by Torres Strait Islander artist Alick Tipoti were painted on one side of the carriages, while the work of Aboriginal artist of the Waanyi people, Judy Watson, was featured on the other side.

Routes

The DTT features a 2×2 economy class seating arrangement, 1×2 business class seating arrangement, in-seat audio and visual entertainment and a TV screen attached to the seat armrest. A trolley service is available, and a club car is part of the consist of this Tilt Train service. In October 2013 when the first refurbished set returned to traffic, the service was named the Spirit of Queensland.

In 2014, the additional train was delivered to operate as a replacement for The Sunlander between Brisbane and Cairns, meaning the only service on this route is the Spirit of Queensland.

Notes and references

External links
Spirit of Queensland
Flickr gallery

High-speed rail
Named passenger trains of Queensland
Railcars of Queensland
Tilting trains
Diesel multiple units with locomotive-like power cars